Adida Melam is an Indian Tamil-language romantic comedy film directed by Anbu Stalin featuring newcomer Abhay Krishna and Abhinaya. Despite being launched in 2012, the film went through production troubles and subsequently had a name change from Mela Thaalam to Adida Melam in 2016, before its release.

Cast
  Abhay Krishna as Saravanan
 Abhinaya as Devaki
 Urvashi
 Jayaprakash
 Swaminathan
 Mayilsamy
 Scissor Manohar
 Mippu

Music
Silambarasan Rajendar has rendered one of the tracks for music director, Abhishek Lawrence. The first song in the movie starting mela thalam was sung by Silambarasan( Simbu).

Reception
The film opened to mixed reviews, with a critic noting "the tone of Adida Melam is wildly inconsistent, swinging from melodrama to comedy, at times even in the same scene".

References

External links

2010s Tamil-language films
2016 films